Ștefan Daniel Radu (born 22 October 1986) is a Romanian professional footballer who plays as a left-back or a centre-back for Serie A club Lazio.

After a stint in his home country with Dinamo București during which he earned three domestic honours, including one national title, Radu moved to Lazio in 2008 on an initial loan. He has since spent his career with the Biancocelesti, gaining team captaincy and winning the Coppa Italia and the Supercoppa Italiana on three occasions each. In 2021, Radu became the leading appearance maker for Lazio in all competitions.

He registered his senior debut for the Romania national team in 2006, and made thirteen appearances before his early retirement in 2013, at age 26.

Club career

Dinamo București
Ștefan Radu was born on 22 October 1986 in Bucharest, growing up in the Colentina neighborhood. On 27 April 2005, Radu made his debut for Dinamo București under coach Ioan Andone in a 3–0 league victory over FCM Bacău. In the 2006–07 Liga I season, helped by the fact that Dinamo had a defender emergency, he was established in the starting eleven by coach Mircea Rednic, making couple in the central defense alongside Cosmin Moți and eventually managing to win the Liga I trophy that season, also managing to pass the group stage of the 2006–07 UEFA Cup, reaching the sixteenths-finals where the team was eliminated with 3–1 on aggregate by Benfica.

Lazio
In January 2008, Italian Serie A side Lazio signed Radu on a €1 million loan deal until the end of the 2007–08 season. Shortly after joining the squad, he made his Lazio debut in a Coppa Italia match against Fiorentina. He was a revelation for Delio Rossi's team, as the young starlet added extra quality to the backline and started all the matches he featured in. At the end of the season, Radu signed with Lazio permanently for a €3.5 million transfer fee.

On 17 June 2011, Radu signed a five-year contract extension. He became an important player for Lazio, a team which he captained during the 2011–12 season. Radu won his third trophy with Lazio in the 2012–13 season when they defeated rivals Roma in the Coppa Italia final. In 2017, Lazio won the Supercoppa Italiana, as they beat Juventus 3–2. On 15 May 2019, Lazio beat Atalanta in the 2018–19 Coppa Italia final. On 22 December 2019, Lazio beat Juventus in the 2019 Supercoppa Italiana, with help from Radu.

International career
Ștefan Radu played 13 games at international level for Romania, making his debut on 15 November 2006 under coach Victor Pițurcă who sent him on the field in the 89th minute in order to replace Răzvan Raț in a friendly which ended with a 1–0 victory against Spain. He played two games at successful Euro 2008 qualifiers, being also part of the squad that went to the final tournament without playing. He also played one game at the 2010 World Cup qualifiers, making his last appearance for the national team on 22 March 2013 in a 2–2 against Hungary at the 2014 World Cup qualifiers. Radu retired from international football in April 2013, citing his strained relationship with the national football federation. Despite continuing to be one of the most prominent Romanian expatriate players in later years, he did not reverse his decision.

On 25 March 2008 he was decorated by President of Romania Traian Băsescu for Romania's successful Euro 2008 qualifying campaign with the Medalia "Meritul Sportiv" – (The Medal "The Sportive Merit") class III.

Career statistics

Club

International

Honours 

Dinamo București
 Liga I: 2006–07
 Cupa României: 2004–05
 Supercupa României: 2005

Lazio
 Coppa Italia: 2008–09, 2012–13, 2018–19
 Supercoppa Italiana: 2009, 2017, 2019

Records
 Lazio all-time appearance holder: 426
 Lazio all-time Serie A appearance holder: 348

Notes

References

External links

Lazio official profile 

1986 births
Living people
Footballers from Bucharest
Romanian footballers
Association football defenders
Liga I players
Liga II players
FC Dinamo București players
Serie A players
S.S. Lazio players
Romania under-21 international footballers
Romania international footballers
UEFA Euro 2008 players
Romanian expatriate footballers
Expatriate footballers in Italy
Romanian expatriate sportspeople in Italy